Fresna maesseni, commonly known as Maessen's Acraea skipper, is a species of butterfly in the family Hesperiidae. It is found in Ivory Coast, Ghana and Cameroon. The habitat consists of forests.

References

Butterflies described in 1971
Astictopterini